Katharina Elisa Naschenweng (born 16 December 1997) is an Austrian footballer who plays as a defender for 1899 Hoffenheim in the Frauen Bundesliga.

Career
Born in Spittal an der Drau, Naschenweng began playing football with local side SV Rothenthurn. At age 18, she signed with ÖFB-Frauenliga side SK Sturm Graz. Three years later, Naschenweng joined German Bundesliga side Hoffenheim.

After scoring four goals in 29 league matches, Naschenweng extended her contract with Hoffenheim through 2023.

Naschenweng was part of the Austrian U-17 national team that competed at the 2014 UEFA Women's Under-17 Championship in England. She was also part of the Austrian U-19 national team that represented Austria at the 2016 UEFA Women's Under-19 Championship in Slovakia. In 2017, Naschenweng was part of the 23-women squad that represented Austria and reached the semi-finals at the UEFA Women's Euro.

International goals
''Scores and results list Austria's goal tally first:

References

External links
 Player's Profile at UEFA
 

1997 births
Living people
Austria women's international footballers
Austrian women's footballers
People from Spittal an der Drau
Women's association football defenders
SK Sturm Graz (women) players
ÖFB-Frauenliga players
TSG 1899 Hoffenheim (women) players
Frauen-Bundesliga players
UEFA Women's Euro 2022 players
UEFA Women's Euro 2017 players
Expatriate women's footballers in Germany
Austrian expatriate sportspeople in Germany
Austrian expatriate women's footballers
Footballers from Carinthia (state)